Wildansyah Edy (born 3 January 1987) is an Indonesian professional footballer who plays as a defender for Liga 1 club Borneo.

Club career

Persib Bandung
At the beginning of the 2008/2009 season, Wildansyah joined Persib Bandung in the Indonesia Super League who coached by Jaya Hartono. He made his debut in the Piala Indonesia against Persires Rengat but he has not made his debut in the Liga Indonesia. He made his debut in Indonesia Super League on April 21, 2009 against Persita Tangerang in Bandung. He was again trusted by Jaya Hartono to play in a match against Deltras F.C. as a substitute.

Pelita Bandung Raya
On 31 December 2013, he was signed by Pelita Bandung Raya.

Sriwijaya FC
On November 30, 2014, he was signed by Sriwijaya.

Persib Bandung
In 2017, Wildansyah signed a contract with Indonesian Liga 1 club Persib Bandung.

Borneo (loan)
He was signed for Borneo to play in the Liga 1 in the 2018 season, on loan from Persib Bandung.

References

External links 
 
 Wildansyah at Liga Indonesia

Living people
1987 births
Sundanese people
People from Bandung
Sportspeople from Bandung
Sportspeople from West Java
Indonesian footballers
Liga 1 (Indonesia) players
Persib Bandung players
Persisam Putra Samarinda players
Pelita Bandung Raya players
Sriwijaya F.C. players
Borneo F.C. players
Association football defenders